National referendums are seldom used in Canada. The first two referendums in 1898 and 1942 saw voters in Quebec and the remainder of Canada take dramatically-opposing stands, and the third in 1992 saw most of the voters take a stand dramatically opposed to that of the politicians in power.

National referendums

Plebiscite on prohibition

The question:
Are you in favor of the passing of an Act prohibiting the importation, manufacture of sale of spirits, wine, ale, beer, cider and all other alcoholic liquors for use as beverages?French: Êtes-vous favorable à la passation d'une loi défendant l'importation, la fabrication ou la vente de spiritueux, vins, bière, ale, cidre et de toutes autres liqueurs alcooliques comme breuvages ?

The majority in favour of Prohibition was so slight and turn-out so low that the government said it did not think it right to adopt the measure.

Plebiscite on conscription

The Question:
Are you in favour of releasing the Government from any obligations arising out of any past commitments restricting the methods of raising men for military service?French: Consentez-vous à libérer le gouvernement de toute obligation résultant d'engagements antérieurs restreignant les méthodes de mobilisation pour le service militaire ?

Based on the result, the government adopted conscription but with a light touch, adopting the initial policy that those conscripted would not be sent overseas to active fighting.

Referendum on the Charlottetown Accord

The Question:
Do you agree that the Constitution of Canada should be renewed on the basis of the agreement reached on August 28, 1992?French: Acceptez-vous que la Constitution du Canada soit renouvelée sur la base de l'entente conclue le 28 août 1992 ?

Proposed referendums
During the 2004 federal election, the NDP stated that it would require the federal government to hold a national referendum on electoral reform (specifically proportional representation) for support from the NDP should the Liberals win a minority government. The Liberals won a minority, and the NDP announced they would press for electoral reform through a referendum. The possibility of a national referendum on electoral reform was made more likely through the Throne speech that opened Parliament in October 2004, in which former Liberal Prime Minister Paul Martin included electoral reform in his plan for the next Parliament. However, after Conservative Leader Stephen Harper became Prime Minister as a result of the 2006 federal election, no moves toward reform of the electoral system were taken until Liberal Leader Justin Trudeau became Prime Minister after the 2015 federal election, in which Trudeau promised to eliminate the current "first-past-the-post" single-member plurality voting system. While Trudeau has said that he advocates a system where the distribution of seats is more in line with the popular vote on a Canada-wide basis, to be achieved by a new type of ballot that allows voters to rank the candidates in order of preference, his government announced in December 2015 that an all-party parliamentary committee would be formed in early 2016 to consider other options too, such as those based on proportional representation. During a discussion of the plan, Democratic Institutions Minister Maryam Monsef referred to it as “an open and robust process of consultation”. However, she refused to commit to the Conservative Party's demand for a public referendum that would allow Canadians to vote on their preferred electoral system, indicating that she does not want to "prejudice the outcome of that consultation process".

There had been discussion regarding a national referendum over the issue of same-sex marriage, which was a highly divisive issue in Canada. A national plebiscite had been suggested by Alberta Premier Ralph Klein and some Conservatives and Liberal backbenchers. However, Paul Martin's Liberal government, with the support of the NDP and Bloc Québécois, passed the Civil Marriage Act, legalizing same-sex marriage through Parliament in July 2005 without holding a plebiscite.  In December 2006, Stephen Harper's government introduced a motion to re-open the marriage debate, which lost.  Notably, members of all parties, including some Conservative cabinet members, voted it down.

Provincial and Territorial referendums

Alberta
Alberta has held several referendums during its history.

Three concerned the adoption, retention and abandonment of Prohibition on the private sale of liquor (1915, 1920 and 1923).

Another was on the government take-over of the electrical generation and distribution system, at the time a mixed system of municipal and private corporate ownership, and the preferred method of rural electrification - private or provincial government.

British Columbia

In British Columbia, a Treaty Referendum was held on First Nations treaty rights in 2002. The referendum proposed eight questions that voters were asked to either support or oppose. Critics claimed the phrasing was flawed or biased toward a predetermined response. Critics, especially First Nations and religious groups, called for a boycott of the referendum, and only about one third of ballots were returned, significantly less than the usual turnout in provincial general elections. The ballots that were returned showed enthusiastic support, with over 80 per cent of participating voters agreeing to all eight proposed principles.

A referendum on electoral reform on May 17, 2005, was held in conjunction with the provincial election that year. British Columbian voters were asked to approve a new electoral system based on the Single Transferable Vote called BC STV. It passed with the support of a majority of voters (57%), but failed to meet the required "supermajority" threshold of 60%. Premier Gordon Campbell announced due to the large support shown for electoral reform a second referendum would be held in correspondence with the 2009 British Columbia general election. This referendum would also have required approval by 60% of those voting.

The second referendum was held on May 12, 2009, in conjunction with the provincial election. The results were a "supermajority" of 60.92% voting for retaining the current "first past the post" electoral system and 39.8% voting for the proposed Single Transferable Vote.

A mail-in referendum was held from June 13 to August 5, 2011, on the fate of the province's harmonized sales tax. The government pledged to discontinue the tax if more than 50% of the voters opt to have the tax discontinued. It was passed, with 55% in favour.

The province held another referendum on proportional representation in late 2018. With 42% turnout, proportional representation was defeated by 61% of the vote.

Manitoba
Manitoba held a referendum on Prohibition in 1902. A majority voted against prohibition.

Newfoundland and Labrador

The island of Newfoundland, then a British colony, held two referendums in 1948 to determine its future. An initial referendum was held on June 3, 1948, to decide between continuing with the British appointed Commission of Government that had ruled the island since the 1930s, revert to dominion status with responsible government, or join Canadian Confederation. The result was inconclusive, with 44.6% supporting the restoration of dominion status, 41.1% for confederation with Canada, and 14.3% for continuing the Commission of Government. A second referendum on July 22, 1948, which asked Newfoundlanders to choose between confederation and dominion status, was decided by a vote of 52% to 48% for confederation with Canada. Newfoundland joined Canada on March 31, 1949.

A referendum was held in Newfoundland and Labrador in 1995 that approved replacing the province's system of parochial schools with a largely public school system. In 1997, a second referendum to amend the Terms of Union to allow for the Catholic and Pentecostal school systems to be disbanded and brought into the public system.

New Brunswick
On May 14, 2001, New Brunswick held a referendum on whether to continue to permit Video Lottery Terminals to operate in the province. 53.1% of those who voted in favour of retaining the terminals.

NWT
Two referendums were held in Northwest Territories.

 1982 division of territory into two regions
 1992 boundary between the two regions, creating Territory of Nunavut in 1999.

Nova Scotia
In 2004, Nova Scotia held a plebiscite on whether to allow 'Sunday shopping'. The result was a slight victory for the No side although the government went ahead and legalized Sunday Shopping the following year after a court decision overturned the law.

Ontario
On October 10, 2007, Ontario held a referendum on whether to adopt a mixed-member proportional system of elections. The proposed system failed with 63% voting for the status quo in favour of First-Past-the-Post. See 2007 Ontario electoral reform referendum for more information. This was the first referendum in that province since 1924 when a referendum on prohibition was held.

Prince Edward Island
The small province of Prince Edward Island (under 150,000 people and therefore in scale more like a municipal government) has had several referendums in its past, although the correct terminology in the province is a plebiscite. 

On January 18, 1988, a provincial plebiscite was held to determine if Islanders were in favour of a fixed link to the mainland. It passed 60% to 40%. This allowed the provincial and federal governments to attract contractors to build what is now the Confederation Bridge. 

On November 28, 2005, Islanders were asked to vote by plebiscite whether or not they wanted mixed-member proportional representation - partly "party list-based" - electoral system. Islanders decided, 64% to 36%, to keep the status quo first-past-the-post based electoral. 

A  plebiscite was held in 2016 concerning mixed-member proportional representation, with the result of 52% of Islanders voting to adopt the changes. Citing low voter turn out (below 40%) in the plebiscite, the government refused to implement the reforms.
Another PEI plebiscite on electoral reform is scheduled for 2019.

Quebec
Three referendums were held in Quebec:

 1919 - April 10: Referendum on the legalization of the sale of alcohol. The Yes side won.
 1980 - May 20: Referendum on the Sovereignty-Association proposal. The No side won.
 1995 - October 30: Referendum on Sovereignty with optional partnership offer. The No side narrowly won.

Officially though, there have been four, as the 1992 pan-Canadian referendum was organized by the DGEQ in Quebec, whereas Elections Canada organized it in the rest of Canada.

Yukon 
Two referendums were held in Yukon.
 1916 August Prohibition. Wets won by three votes.
 1920 February Prohibition. Prohibitionists narrowly had more votes than those who wanted bars continued and also narrowly more votes than those who wanted government liquor stores.

References